Califano is an Italian surname. Notable people with the surname include:

Arcangelo Califano (fl. 1730s-1750s), Italian composer and musician
Aniello Califano (1870-1919), Italian poet and writer
Christian Califano (born 1972), French rugby player
Dan Califano (fl. 1973), Argentine or American soccer player
Franco Califano (1938–2013), Italian musician 
John Edmund Califano (1862-1946), American artist
Joseph A. Califano Jr. (born 1931), American jurist, government administrator, and writer